The University of the Cape of Good Hope, renamed the University of South Africa in 1916, was created when the Molteno government passed Act 16 of 1873 in the Cape of Good Hope Parliament. Modelled on the University of London, it offered examinations but not tuition, and had the power to confer degrees upon successful examination candidates. Today, this function still exists within the Department of Music where, for over 100 years, music pupils have been examined.

List of chancellors
1874-1876:
1876–1880: William Porter
1880–1884: Sir Henry Bartle Edward Frere
1884–1890: The Earl of Carnarvon
1890–1898: Sir Langham Dale
1898–1901: Justice Charles Thomas Smith
1901–1912: the Duke of Cornwall and York (the future George V)
1912-1918: Field-Marshal Duke of Connaught and Strathearn

References

Educational institutions established in 1873
University of South Africa
1873 establishments in the Cape Colony